Callie-Theron Visagie (born 9 July 1988) was a South African rugby union footballer. His regular playing position was hooker. He most recently represented the Bulls in Super Rugby and the Blue Bulls in Currie Cup. He was included in the Springbok squad for the 2014 Incoming tour. He previously played for the Golden Lions, Western Province and captained Maties in the Varsity Cup.

Callie obtained his Bachelor of Accounting degree with Honours at Stellenbosch University, and subsequently qualified as a Chartered Accountant through the South African Institute of Chartered Accountants while simultaneously pursuing his professional rugby career. Following his career-ending injury in 2016, he moved to London and began working at Goldman Sachs. He currently lives with his wife, Jenna and their son, Nicholas, in London.

References

External links

itsrugby.co.uk profile

Living people
1988 births
South African rugby union players
Western Province (rugby union) players
Golden Lions players
Lions (United Rugby Championship) players
Blue Bulls players
Bulls (rugby union) players
Sportspeople from Paarl
Alumni of Paarl Boys' High School
Stellenbosch University alumni
Afrikaner people
Rugby union hookers
Rugby union players from the Western Cape